Dr. James Higgs 
 ? 1829 in Lambeth; † 26. April 1902 in London was an English organist and teacher.

Life

James Higgs, studied under his father, an amateur of ability. He succeeded the late Dr. Wylde as organist of Eaton Chapel in 1844 and in the following year, on the secession of his brother Marcellus Higgs, he became organist of St. Benet and St.Peter, Paul's Wharf. His successive organ appointments were St. Mark's, Kennington, 1852–64, St.Michael's, Stockwell, 1864-7 and for twenty-eight years of St. Andrews, Holborn, 1867 to 1895, when he retired from playing in public.

In 1864 he was among the first twenty-one member of the Royal College of Organists. Some years later, in 1867, he was appointed as examiner for the Royal College of Organists and from then on he frequently acted as examiner. Even later, in 1874, he graduated Mus. Bac. Oxon from New College, Oxford. His well-deserved doctor's degree was conferred upon him by the Archbishop of Canterbury.

As original member of the Musical Association, he succeeded the late Charles Kensington Salaman as Hon.Secretary in 1877, and held the post for six years. He read two instructive papers before the Association - on 'Bach's Art of Fugue', in 1877, and 'Samuel Wesley : his life, times, and influence on music', in 1894. He was the author of two useful primers - Fugue, and Modulation. In collaboration with Sir Frederic Bridge he edited 'Bach's Organ Music', and he was the editor of a collection of two-part Solfeggi in Novello's Primer Series.

In 1883 he was appointed as one of the Directors of Trinity College, London and Professor of Harmony at the Royal College of Music. In 1900 he received the appointment of Dean of the Faculty of Music at the University of London. In the Musical Times, the uncredited obituary concluded with the following. "Dr. Higgs will be long remembered for his thoroughness as a teacher and for his kindly nature - qualities possessed by him in no small degree, and to which the present writer, one of his old pupils, bears full and grateful testimony".

Appointments

Organist of St Peter's Church, Eaton Square 1843
Organist of St Benet's, Paul's Wharf 1844 – 1852
Organist of St Mark's Church, Kennington 1852 – 1864
Organist of St. Michael's Church, Stockwell 1864 - 1867
Organist of St Andrew's, Holborn 1867 – 1895

Publications

Editor of a collection of two-part Solfeggi, Novello Primer Series.
Joint editor of the organ works of J.S. Bach with Sir Frederick Bridge.

References

1829 births
1902 deaths
English classical organists
British male organists
Alumni of New College, Oxford
Academics of the Royal College of Music
19th-century English musicians
19th-century British male musicians
19th-century classical musicians
Male classical organists
19th-century organists